Baloch, Baluch or Baluchi is a surname. Notable persons with that name include:

 Abdul Hai Baloch (1946–2022), Pakistani politician
 Aftab Baloch (1953–2022), Pakistani cricketer
 Ammar al-Baluchi (born 1977), Pakistani al-Qaeda member
 Dervish Bejah Jakhrani Baloch, usually referred to as Dervish Bejah, 19th C cameleer in Australia
 Dost Mohammad Khan Baloch (died 1930), Baloch ruler
 Habib Jalib Baloch (died 2010), Baloch nationalist politician
 Joy Baluch (1932–2013), Australian politician
Karima Baloch (1983–2020), a Pakistani human rights activist
 Kiran Baluch (born 1978), Pakistani cricketer
 Liaqat Baloch (born 1952), Pakistani political leader
 Mahnoor Baloch, Pakistani actress
 Mohammed Baloch, or Mehul Kumar (born 1949), Indian filmmaker
 Muhammad Dhahir Baluch, Iranian rebel
 Nabi Bakhsh Khan Baloch (1917–2011), Pakistani scholar
 Naeem Baloch, Afghan politician
 Naz Baloch, Pakistani politician
 Qandeel Baloch (1990–2016), Pakistani model, actress, feminist activist and social media celebrity
 Qurat-ul-Ain Balouch, Pakistani singer, musician and composer
 Sanaullah Baloch (born 1971), Pakistani politician
 Siddiq Baloch (born 1940), Pakistani journalist
 Sanam Baloch, Pakistani actress